HMS Speedy was a 6-gun  built for the Royal Navy during the 1820s. She was broken up in 1876.

Description
The ship's tonnage was 123 tons burthen. The Nightingale class was armed with two 6-pounder cannon and four 6-pounder carronades. The ships had a crew of 34 officers and ratings.

Construction and career
Speedy, the fourth ship of her name to serve in the Royal Navy, was ordered in 1822, laid down in November 1827 at Pembroke Dockyard, Wales, and launched on 28 June 1828. She was completed on 2 November 1828 at Plymouth Dockyard.

Notes

References

Nightingale-class cutter
1828 ships
Ships built in Pembroke Dock